Simen Hegstad Krüger  (born 13 March 1993) is a Norwegian cross-country skier who competes in the FIS Cross-Country World Cup. He represents the club Lyn.  He won the gold medal in the 2018 Olympics Skiathlon event, leading a medal sweep by the Norwegians.

Cross-country skiing results
All results are sourced from the International Ski Federation (FIS).

Olympic Games
 4 medals – (2 gold, 1 silver, 1 bronze)

Distance reduced to 30 km due to weather conditions.

World Championships
 6 medals – (3 gold, 2 silver, 1 bronze)

World Cup

Season standings

Individual podiums
9 victories – (7 , 2 ) 
23 podiums – (16 , 7 )

Team podiums
 4 victories – (4 ) 
 8 podiums – (8 )

References

External links
 
 

1993 births
Living people
Skiers from Oslo
Norwegian male cross-country skiers
Tour de Ski skiers
Cross-country skiers at the 2018 Winter Olympics
Cross-country skiers at the 2022 Winter Olympics
Olympic cross-country skiers of Norway
Medalists at the 2018 Winter Olympics
Medalists at the 2022 Winter Olympics
Olympic gold medalists for Norway
Olympic silver medalists for Norway
Olympic bronze medalists for Norway
Olympic medalists in cross-country skiing
FIS Nordic World Ski Championships medalists in cross-country skiing